Dmitry Pestunov (born January 22, 1985) is a Russian professional ice hockey player who currently plays for Gyergyói HK of the Erste Liga. He was selected by Phoenix Coyotes in the 3rd round (80th overall) of the 2003 NHL Entry Draft.

Pestunov was traded during the 2014–15 season by HC Dynamo Moscow in a return to Chelyabinsk on October 27, 2014.

Career statistics

Regular season and playoffs

International

References

External links

1985 births
Living people
Arizona Coyotes draft picks
Avangard Omsk players
Avtomobilist Yekaterinburg players
Russian ice hockey centres
HC Dynamo Moscow players
HC Spartak Moscow players
Metallurg Magnitogorsk players
Traktor Chelyabinsk players
Sportspeople from Oskemen
Russian expatriate ice hockey people
Expatriate ice hockey players in Hungary
Expatriate ice hockey players in Romania
Expatriate ice hockey players in Latvia
Expatriate ice hockey players in Belarus
Russian expatriate sportspeople in Hungary
Russian expatriate sportspeople in Latvia
Russian expatriate sportspeople in Belarus
Russian expatriate sportspeople in Romania
Debreceni EAC (ice hockey) players